Greenup Township is one of eight townships in Cumberland County, Illinois, USA.  As of the 2010 census, its population was 2,413 and it contained 1,140 housing units.

Geography
The Embarras River defines a portion of the township's western border.

Cities, towns, villages
 Greenup

Unincorporated towns
 Dees at 
 Liberty Hill at 
 Timothy at 
 Walla Walla at

Cemeteries
The township contains these seven cemeteries: Block, Boots, Greenup, Harmony, Liberty Hill, Paul and Peach Orchard.

Major highways
  Interstate 70
  U.S. Route 40
  Illinois Route 121
  Illinois Route 130

Demographics

School districts
 Casey-Westfield Community Unit School District 4c
 Cumberland Community Unit School District 77
 Jasper County Community Unit School District 1

Political districts
 State House District 109
 State Senate District 55

References
 
 United States Census Bureau 2009 TIGER/Line Shapefiles
 United States National Atlas

External links
 City-Data.com
 Illinois State Archives
 Township Officials of Illinois

Adjacent townships 

1860 establishments in Illinois
Populated places established in 1860
Townships in Cumberland County, Illinois
Charleston–Mattoon, IL Micropolitan Statistical Area
Townships in Illinois